Batts Hall (abbreviated BAT) is a building on the South Mall of the University of Texas at Austin campus in Austin, Texas, United States. The five-floor, 39,143-square-foot structure is named after Robert Lynn Batts.

History
The building was constructed during 1952–1953, and named after former law professor and Board of Regents chairman Robert Lynn Batts. It was dedicated "to the study and teaching of modern foreign languages that men may understand one another". Dr. Robert Haden Williams, a professor of Romance languages, helped plan and design the structure.

In 1965, Harry H. Ransom delivered his "State of the University" speech in Batts' auditorium, launching the 'Texas Today and Tomorrow' series' fourth annual convocation. The building housed the Departments of Germanic, Romantic and Slavic Languages, as of 1973.

References

External links

 

1953 establishments in Texas
University of Texas at Austin campus
University and college buildings completed in 1953